High Ridge is a suburb of St. Louis and census-designated place (CDP) in Jefferson County, Missouri, United States. The population was 4,257 at the 2020 census.

Geography
High Ridge is located in northern Jefferson County at  (38.465787, -90.527517). It is bordered to the north by Peaceful Village and Parkville. Missouri Route 30 runs through the community, leading northeast  to downtown St. Louis and southwest  to St. Clair.

High Ridge is a nine-armed local topographic high, capped with the Bushberg Sandstone and part of the Burlington Escarpment. The high point of the ridge is located near the Senior Center just north of High Ridge Boulevard (old Gravois/Missouri Highway 30). Flowing off this topographic high are Antire Creek, Rock Creek, Williams Creek, Saline Creek, Sugar Creek, Romaine Creek, Bear Creek, Little Antire Creek, and lesser streams. The high ground is bounded to the west by the Big River and to the west, north, and east by the Meramec River. The ridge is very cherty, and poor for conventional farming, hence the area became known for fruit trees, strawberries, blackberries, and truck farm produce which were sold in St. Louis.

History
A post office called High Ridge has been in operation since 1856. The community was so named on account of its lofty elevation.

Demographics

As of the census of 2000, there were 4,236 people, 1,556 households, and 1,145 families residing in the CDP. The racial makeup of the CDP was 97.78% White, 0.31% African American, 0.12% Native American, 0.40% Asian, 0.14% from other races, and 1.25% from two or more races. Hispanic or Latino of any race were 1.16% of the population.

There were 1,556 households, out of which 37.7% had children under the age of 18 living with them, 57.7% were married couples living together, 11.4% had a female householder with no husband present, and 26.4% were non-families. 20.8% of all households were made up of individuals, and 5.6% had someone living alone who was 65 years of age or older. The average household size was 2.70 and the average family size was 3.13.

In the CDP, the population was spread out, with 27.5% under the age of 18, 9.1% from 18 to 24, 33.3% from 25 to 44, 22.1% from 45 to 64, and 8.0% who were 65 years of age or older. The median age was 35 years. For every 100 females, there were 101.2 males. For every 100 females age 18 and over, there were 96.7 males.

The median income for a household in the CDP was $46,742, and the median income for a family was $50,125. Males had a median income of $36,053 versus $27,394 for females. The per capita income for the CDP was $17,959. About 4.7% of families and 5.4% of the population were below the poverty line, including 7.3% of those under age 18 and 18.9% of those age 65 or over.

Education
Northwest R-I School District operates three elementary schools in High Ridge, High Ridge Elementary, Brennan Woods Elementary, and Murphy Elementary.

High Ridge has a public library, a branch of the Jefferson County Library.

Notable people 
 Bill Alter, Missouri state senator
 Michael Chandler, professional MMA fighter, NCAA wrestling All American (University of Missouri)
 Sarah Haskins, Olympic triathlete

References

Census-designated places in Jefferson County, Missouri
Census-designated places in Missouri